In mathematics, a Dupin cyclide or cyclide of Dupin is any geometric inversion of a standard torus, cylinder or double cone. In particular, these latter are themselves examples of Dupin cyclides. They were discovered by (and named after) Charles Dupin in his 1803 dissertation under Gaspard Monge. The key property of a Dupin cyclide is that it is a channel surface (envelope of a one-parameter family of spheres) in two different ways. This property means that Dupin cyclides are natural objects in Lie sphere geometry.

Dupin cyclides are often simply known as cyclides, but the latter term is also used to refer to a more general class of quartic surfaces which are important in the theory of separation of variables for the Laplace equation in three dimensions.

Dupin cyclides were investigated not only by Dupin, but also by A. Cayley, J.C. Maxwell and Mabel M. Young.

Dupin cyclides are used in computer-aided design because cyclide patches have rational representations and are suitable for blending canal surfaces (cylinder, cones, tori, and others).

Definitions and properties
There are several equivalent definitions of Dupin cyclides. In , they can be defined as the images under any inversion of tori, cylinders and double cones. This shows that the class of Dupin cyclides is invariant under Möbius (or conformal) transformations.
In complex space  these three latter varieties can be mapped to one another by inversion, so Dupin cyclides can be defined as inversions of the torus (or the cylinder, or the double cone).

Since a standard torus is the orbit of a point under a two dimensional abelian subgroup of the Möbius group, it follows that the cyclides also are, and this provides a second way to define them.

A third property which characterizes Dupin cyclides is that their curvature lines are all circles (possibly through the point at infinity). Equivalently, the curvature spheres, which are the spheres tangent to the surface with radii equal to the reciprocals of the principal curvatures at the point of tangency, are constant along the corresponding curvature lines: they are the tangent spheres containing the corresponding curvature lines as great circles. Equivalently again, both sheets of the focal surface degenerate to conics. It follows that any Dupin cyclide is a channel surface (i.e., the envelope of a one-parameter family of spheres) in two different ways, and this gives another characterization.

The definition in terms of spheres shows that the class of Dupin cyclides is invariant under the larger group of all Lie sphere transformations; any two Dupin cyclides are Lie-equivalent. They form (in some sense) the simplest class of Lie-invariant surfaces after the spheres, and are therefore particularly significant in Lie sphere geometry.

The definition also means that a Dupin cyclide is the envelope of the one-parameter family of spheres tangent to three given mutually tangent spheres. It follows that it is tangent to infinitely many Soddy's hexlet configurations of spheres.

Parametric and implicit representation 
 (CS): A Dupin cyclide can be represented in two ways as the envelope of a one parametric pencil of spheres, i.e. it is a canal surface with two directrices. The pair of directrices are focal conics and consists either of an ellipse and a hyperbola or of two parabolas. In the first case one defines the cyclide as elliptic, in the second case as parabolic. In both cases the conics are contained in two mutually orthogonal planes. In extreme cases (if the ellipse is a circle) the hyperbola degenerates to a line and the cyclide is a torus of revolution.

A further special property of a cyclide is:
 (CL): Any curvature line of a Dupin cyclide is a circle.

Elliptic cyclides 
An elliptic cyclide can be represented parametrically by the following formulas (see section Cyclide as channel surface):

The numbers  are the semi major and semi minor axes and  the linear eccentricity of the ellipse: 
 
The hyperbola 
is the focal conic to the ellipse. That means: The foci/vertices of the ellipse are the vertices/foci of the hyperbola. The two conics form the two degenerated focal surfaces of the cyclide.

 can be considered as the average radius of the generating spheres.

For  ,  respectively one gets the curvature lines (circles) of the surface.

The corresponding implicit representation is:

In case of   one gets , i. e. the ellipse is a circle and the hyperbola degenerates to a line. The corresponding cyclides are tori of revolution.

More intuitive design parameters are the intersections of the cyclide with the x-axis. See section Cyclide through 4 points on the x-axis.

Parabolic cyclides 
A parabolic cyclide can be represented by the following parametric representation (see section Cyclide as channel surface):

The number  determines the shape of both the parabolas, which are focal conics: 
 and 

 determines the relation of the diameters of the two holes (see diagram).  means: both diameters are equal.

A corresponding implicit representation is

Remark: By displaying the circles there appear gaps which are caused by the necessary restriction of the parameters .

Cyclide as channel surface 

There are two ways to generate an elliptic Dupin cyclide as a channel surface. The first one uses an ellipse as directrix, the second one a hyperbola:

Ellipse as directrix 

In the x-y-plane the directrix is the ellipse with equation
It has the parametric representation

 is the semi major and  the semi minor axis.
 is the linear eccentricity of the ellipse. Hence: .
The radii of the generating spheres are

 is a design parameter. It can be seen as the average of the radii of the spheres. In case of  the ellipse is a circle and the cyclide a torus of revolution with  the radius of the generating circle (generatrix).

In the diagram: .

Maxwell property 
The following simple relation between the actual sphere center (ellipse point) and the corresponding sphere radius is due to Maxwell:

 The difference/sum of the sphere's radius and the distance of the sphere's center (ellipse point) from one (but fixed) of the foci is constant. 

Proof
If one chooses  and calculates the distance , one gets . Together with the radius of the actual sphere (see above) one gets .

Choosing the other focus yields:  

Hence:

In the x-y-plane the envelopes of the circles of the spheres are two circles with the foci of the ellipse as centers and the radii  (see diagram).

Cyclide through 4 points on the x-axis 

The Maxwell-property gives reason for determining a ring cyclide by prescribing its intersections with the x-axis:

Given: Four points  on the x-axis (see diagram).

Wanted: Center , semiaxes , linear eccentricity  and foci of the directrix ellipse  and the parameter  of the corresponding ring cyclide.

From the Maxwell-property one derives
 
Solving for  yields
 
The foci (on the x-axis) are  
 and hence
  
The center of the focal conics (ellipse and hyperbola) has the x-coordinate

Meaning of the order of the numbers 
(The calculation above presumes , see diagram.)

(H) Swapping  generates a horn cyclide.
(S) Swapping , generates a spindel cyclide.
(H1) For  one gets a 1-horn cyclide.
(R) For  one gets a ring cyclide touching itself at the origin.

Parallel surfaces 

By increasing or decreasing parameter , such that the type does not change, one gets parallel surfaces (similar to parallel curves) of the same type (see diagram).

Hyperbola as directrix 

The second way to generate the ring cyclide as channel surface uses the focal hyperbola as directrix. It has the equation

In this case the spheres touch the cyclide from outside at the second family of circles (curvature lines). To each arm of the hyperbola belongs a subfamily of circles. The spheres of one family enclose the cyclide (in diagram: purple). Spheres of the other family are touched from outside by the cyclide (blue).

Parametric representation of the hyperbola:

The radii of the corresponding spheres are 

In case of a torus the hyperbola degenerates into the axis of the torus.

Maxwell-property (hyperbola case)
Analogously one gets  . For a point on the second arm of the hyperbola one derives the equations: 

Hence: 

In the x-z-plane the circles of the spheres with centers  and radii  have the two circles (in diagram grey) with centers  and radii  as envelopes.

Derivation of the parametric representation

Elliptic cyclide 

The ellipse and hyperbola (focal conics) are the degenerated focal surfaces of the elliptic cyclide. For any pair  of points of the ellipse and hyperbola the following is true (because of the definition of a focal surface):
1) The line  is a normal of the cyclide and
2) the corresponding point  of the cyclide divides the chord  with relation  (see diagram).

From the parametric representation of the focal conics and the radii of the spheres
Ellipse: 
Hyperbola: 

one gets the corresponding point  of the cyclide (see diagram):

(For the unusual but convenient parametric representation of the hyperbola: see  hyperbola.)

Calculation in detail leads to the parametric representation of the elliptic cyclide given above.

If one uses the parametric representation given in the article on channel surfaces, then, in general, only one family of parametric curves consists of circles.

Parabolic cyclide 

The derivation of the parametric representation for the parabolic case runs analogously:

With the parametric representations of the focal parabolas (degenerated focal surfaces) and the radii of the spheres:

one gets 

which provides the parametric representation above of a parabolic cyclide.

Dupin cyclides and geometric inversions 

An advantage for investigations of cyclides is the property:
 (I): Any Dupin cyclide is the image either of a right circular cylinder or a right circular double cone or a torus of revolution by an inversion (reflection at a sphere).

The inversion at the sphere with equation  can be described analytically by:
 
The most important properties of an inversion at a sphere are:
 Spheres and circles are mapped on the same objects.
 Planes and lines containing the origin (center of inversion) are mapped on themselves.
 Planes and lines not containing the origin are mapped on spheres or circles passing the origin.
 An inversion is involutory (identical with the inverse mapping).
 An inversion preserves angles.

One can map arbitrary surfaces by an inversion. The formulas above give in any case parametric or implicit representations of the image surface, if the surfaces are given parametrically or implicitly. In case of a parametric surface one gets:

But: Only in case of right circular cylinders and cones and tori of revolution one gets Dupin cyclides and vice versa.

Example cylinder 
a) Because lines, which do not contain the origin, are mapped by an inversion at a sphere (in picture: magenta) on circles containing the origin the image of the cylinder is a ring cyclide with mutually touching circles at the origin. As the images of the line segments, shown in the picture, there appear on line circle segments as images. The spheres which touch the cylinder on the inner side are mapped on a first pencil of spheres which generate the cyclide as a canal surface. The images of the tangent planes of the cylinder become the second pencil of spheres touching the cyclide. The latter ones pass through the origin.
b) The second example inverses a cylinder that contains the origin. Lines passing the origin are mapped onto themselves. Hence the surface is unbounded and a parabolic cyclide.

Example cone 
The lines generating the cone are mapped on circles, which intersect at the origin and the image of the cone's vertex. The image of the cone is a double horn cyclide. The picture shows the images of the line segments (of the cone), which are circles segments, actually.

Example torus 
Both the pencils of circles on the torus (shown in the picture) are mapped on the corresponding pencils of circles on the cyclide. In case of a self-intersecting torus one would get a spindle cyclide.

Villarceau circles

Because Dupin ring-cyclides can be seen as images of tori via suitable inversions and an inversion maps a circle onto a circle or line, the images of the Villarceau circles form further two families of circles on a cyclide (see diagram). 

Determining the designparameters 
The formula of the inversion of a parametric surface (see above) provides a parametric representation of a cyclide (as inversion of a torus) with circles as parametric curves. But the points of a parametric net are not well distributed. So it is better to calculate the design parameters  and to use the parametric representation above:

Given: A torus, which is shifted out of the standard position along the x-axis. 
Let be  the intersections of the torus with the x-axis (see diagram). All not zero. Otherwise the inversion of the torus would not be a ring-cyclide.
Wanted: semi-axes  and linear eccentricity  of the ellipse (directrix) and parameter  of the ring-cyclide, which is the image of the torus under the inversion at the unitsphere.

The inversion maps  onto , which are the x-coordinates of 4 points of the ring-cyclide (see diagram). From section Cyclide through 4 points on the x-axis one gets 
  and
 
The center of the focal conics has the x-ccordinate

Separation of variables
Dupin cyclides are a special case of a more general notion of a cyclide, which is a natural extension of the notion of a quadric surface. Whereas a quadric can be described as the zero-set of second order polynomial in Cartesian coordinates (x1,x2,x3), a cyclide is given by the zero-set of a second order polynomial in (x1,x2,x3,r2), where
r2=x12+x22+x32. Thus it is a quartic surface in Cartesian coordinates, with an equation of the form:

where Q is a 3x3 matrix, P and R are a 3-dimensional vectors, and A and B are constants.

Families of cyclides give rise to various cyclidic coordinate geometries.

In Maxime Bôcher's 1891 dissertation, Ueber die Reihenentwickelungen der Potentialtheorie, it was shown that the Laplace equation in three variables can be solved using separation of variables in 17 conformally distinct quadric and cyclidic coordinate geometries.  Many other cyclidic geometries can be obtained by studying R-separation of variables for the Laplace equation.

See also
 Inversion of curves and surfaces (German)

External links 
  Dupin cyclides on MathCurve

Notes

References
 .
 .
 .
 .
 .
 .
 .
 A. Cayley (1873) "On the cyclide", Quarterly Journal of Pure and Applied Mathematics 12: p. 148–163.
 V. Chandru, D. Dutta, C.M. Hoffmann (1989) "On the geometry of Dupin cyclides", The Visual Computer. (5), p. 277–290.
 C. Dupin (1822) Applications de Geometrie et de Mechanique. Bachelier, Paris.
 F. Klein, W. Blaschke (1926) Vorlesungen Über Höhere Geometrie. Springer-Verlag, p. 56.
 J. C. Maxwell (1868) "On the cyclide", Quarterly Journal of Pure and Applied Mathematics 9: p. 111–126.
 M. J. Pratt (1989) Cyclide Blending in Solid Modelling. In: Wolfgang Strasser, Hans-Peter Seidel (Hrsg.): Theory and Practice in Geometric Modelling. Springer-Verlag, p. 235.
 Y. L. Srinivas, V. Kumar, D. Dutta (1996) "Surface design using cyclide patches", Computer-Aided Design 28(4): 263–276.
 Mabel M. Young (1916) "Dupin's cyclide as a self-dual surface", American Journal of Mathematics 38(3): 269–286

External links

 
 E. Berberich, M. Kerber: Arrangements on Surfaces of Genus One: Tori and Dupin Cyclides.

Surfaces